The year 1907 in film involved some significant events.


Events
 January 19 – Variety publishes its first film review.
 The Kalem Company founded in New York City by Frank J. Marion, Samuel Long, and George Kleine. 
 May 7 – Seattle film maker William Harbeck sets up a camera at the front of a B.C. Electric streetcar and films the downtown streets of Vancouver, British Columbia. Pieces of the film, the earliest surviving footage of the city, have disappeared, only about 7 minutes remain.
 May 29 – Salaviinanpolttajat, also known as The Moonshiners, the first fictional film made in Finland, is released.
 June 20 – L'Enfant prodigue, the first feature-length motion picture produced in Europe, opens in Paris.
 Peerless Film Manufacturing Company was founded in Chicago by George K. Spoor and Gilbert M. Anderson. On August 10, the studio name was changed to Essanay Studios ("S and A").
 November 28 - In Haverhill, Massachusetts, scrap-metal dealer Louis B. Mayer opens his first movie theater (in a few years he had the largest theater chain in New England and in 1917 he founded his own production company, which eventually became part of Metro-Goldwyn-Mayer).
 December 7 – First Ben-Hur film, directed by Sidney Olcott and produced by the Kalem Company, released.
 Carl Laemmle, later of Universal, experiments with combining audio from phonographs with film. Laemmle's experiments lead to the German development of "Syncroscope." Syncroscope had several successful demonstrations, but was eventually abandoned.

Films released in 1907

B
 Ben Hur, directed by Sidney Olcott, based on the 1880 novel Ben-Hur: A Tale of the Christ by Lew Wallace – (US)
 The Bewildering Cabinet (Le Placard infernal) (lost), directed by Georges Méliès – (France)

C
 The Clock-Maker's Secret (Le Secret de l'horloger), directed by Gaston Velle – (France)
 Le Cochon Danseur (The Dancing Pig), directed by Millard Mercury – (France)
 A Curious Dream, directed by J. Stuart Blackton – (US)

D
 The Doll's Revenge, directed by Cecil Hepworth – (GB)

E
 The Eclipse, or the Courtship of the Sun and Moon (L'éclipse du soleil en pleine lune), directed by Georges Méliès – (France)
 L'Enfant prodigue (The Prodigal Son), directed by Michel Carré, starring Georges Wague – (France)

F
 First Prize for the Cello (Premier Prix de violoncelle) – (France)

G
 The Golden Beetle (Le Scarabée d'or), directed by Segundo de Chomón – (France)
 Good Glue Sticks (La Colle universelle), directed by Georges Méliès – (France)

H
 The Haunted Hotel, directed by J. Stuart Blackton – (US)

L
 Laughing Gas, directed by Edwin S. Porter – (US)
 Løvejagten (The Lion Hunt), directed by Viggo Larsen – (Denmark)

M
 La Marseillaise, directed by Georges Mendel – (France)

P
 The Policemen's Little Run (La Course des sergents de ville), directed by Ferdinand Zecca – (France)

R
 The Race for the Sausage (Course à la saucisse), directed by Alice Guy – (France)
 The Red Spectre (Le spectre rouge), directed by Segundo de Chomón and Ferdinand Zecca – (France)
 Robert Macaire and Bertrand (Robert Macaire et Bertrand, les rois de cambrioleurs), directed by Georges Méliès – (France)

S
 Salaviinanpolttajat (The Moonshiners) (lost), directed by Louis Sparre and Teuvo Puro – (Finland)
 Satan s'amuse (Satan at Play), directed by Segundo de Chomón – (France)

T
 That Fatal Sneeze, directed by Lewin Fitzhamon – (GB)
 Tunneling the English Channel (Le Tunnel sous la Manche ou le Cauchemar franco-anglais), directed by Georges Méliès – (France)

U
 Under the Seas (Deux Cents Milles sous les mers ou le Cauchemar du pêcheur) (incomplete), directed by Georges Méliès, based on the 1870 novel Twenty Thousand Leagues Under the Seas by Jules Verne – (France)

V
 Vancouver, directed by William Harbeck – (Canada)

W
 When the Devil Drives, directed by Walter R. Booth – (GB)

Births

Deaths
 August 30 – Richard Mansfield, stage actor who influenced many later film actors (born 1857)

Debuts
 Linda Arvidson – Mr. Gay and Mrs. (short)
 Robert Harron – Dr. Skinium (short)
 William S. Hart – Ben Hur (short)
 Florence Turner – How to Cure a Cold (short)

External links

References

 
Film by year